Richard D. "Dicky" Lyons, Sr. (born August 11, 1947, in Louisville, Kentucky) is a former American football defensive back of the National Football League.

Football career
Lyons was drafted by the Atlanta Falcons in the fourth round of the 1969 NFL Draft. He played college football at Kentucky.  He attended high school at St Xavier High School Louisville, Kentucky where he played football as a running back.

Lyons also played for the New Orleans Saints and the World Football League's Birmingham Americans. He is the father of former Kentucky wide receiver Dicky Lyons, Jr.

1947 births
Living people
Players of American football from Louisville, Kentucky
American football return specialists
American football defensive backs
Kentucky Wildcats football players
Atlanta Falcons players
New Orleans Saints players
Birmingham Americans players